Hilaria is a genus of North American plants in the grass family. Members of the genus are commonly known as curly mesquite. They are found in the Southwestern United States, Mexico, and Guatemala.

The generic name honors French naturalist Augustin Saint-Hilaire (1779–1853).

 Species
 Hilaria annua Reeder & C.Reeder - Colima
 Hilaria belangeri (Steud.) Nash  USA (Arizona, New Mexico, Texas) south to Oaxaca
 Hilaria cenchroides Kunth - from Chihuahua to Guatemala; naturalized in Arizona (Pima + Cochise Counties)
 Hilaria ciliata (Scribn.) Sohns - from Chihuahua to Oaxaca
 Hilaria hintonii Sohns - Guerrero, Morelos, Querétaro, México State
 Hilaria jamesii  (Torr.) Benth. - United States (Arizona, California, Colorado, Kansas, Oklahoma, Nevada, New Mexico, Texas, Utah, Wyoming)
 Hilaria mutica (Buckley) Benth. - USA (Arizona, New Mexico, Oklahoma, Texas), Mexico (Chihuahua, Coahuila, Nuevo León, Durango, Zacatecas, Sonora, Baja California Sur)
 Hilaria rigida (Thurb.) Benth. ex Scribn. - United States (Arizona, California, Nevada, New Mexico, Utah), Mexico (Chihuahua, Sonora, Baja California)
 Hilaria semplei Sohns - Michoacán
 Hilaria swallenii Cory  - United States (New Mexico, Texas), Mexico (Chihuahua, Coahuila, Nuevo León, Durango, San Luis Potosí, Zacatecas)

References

Chloridoideae
Grasses of North America
Grasses of Mexico
Grasses of the United States
Poaceae genera